DISC assessments are behavioral self-assessment tools based on the 1928 DISC emotional and behavioral theory of psychologist William Moulton Marston. The tools are designed to predict job performance. However, the scientific validity of DISC has been contested and is by some considered to be a pseudoscience.

DISC is an acronym, the theory describing personality through four claimed central traits: dominance, inducement, submission, and compliance.

Types 
The first self-assessment based on Marston's DISC theory was created in 1956 by Walter Clarke, an industrial psychologist. In 1956, Clarke created the Activity Vector Analysis, a checklist of adjectives on which he asked people to indicate descriptions that were accurate about themselves. This self-assessment was intended for use in businesses needing assistance in choosing qualified employees.

Merenda, Peter F., and Clarke published their findings on a new instrument in the January 1965 issue of the Journal of Clinical Psychology. Instead of using a checklist, the "Self Description" test asks respondents to make a choice between two or more terms. "Self Description" was used by John Geier to create the Personal Profile System in the 1970s.

Uses 
The self-assessment tools are designed for use in personnel management in businesses. A DISC assessment helps to identify workstyle preferences, determines how a someone would interact with others, and provides insight on work habits and preferences. 

DISC has been used to help determine a course of action when dealing with problems as a leadership team—that is, taking the various aspects of each DISC type into account when solving problems or assigning jobs.

Psychometric properties 
The DISC assessments have demonstrated no ability to predict job performance as the validity is low. The assessment has high reliability, meaning that an individual will consistently get the same result over time.

Reliability 
A Russian pilot study found a coefficient of .89 for retesting after one week.

A research paper in the Scandinavian Psychological Association also found high levels of internal consistency in a normative DISC assessment.

Validity 
Psychologist Wendell Williams has criticized the use of DISC in the employee recruitment process. In his criticism, Williams argues that a good job performance test should be well constructed, have test-retest reliability, have Criterion Validity for criteria of job performance, and incorporate the theory of job performance in the test's design.

A 2013 German study studied the validity and reliability of a DISC assessment, Persolog, to see if it was up to standards for the TBS-DTk  the test assessment system of the Diagnostics and Test Board of the Federation of German Psychological Associations. 
The study found that it "largely" met the requirements in terms of reliability but not at all in terms of validity.

Theory 

The DISC theory describes personality through four central traits:
 Dominance: active use of force to overcome resistance in the environment
 Inducement: use of charm in order to deal with obstacles
 Submission: warm and voluntary acceptance of the need to fulfill a request
 Compliance: fearful adjustment to a superior force

Marston described the DISC characteristics in his 1928 book Emotions of Normal People, which he generated from emotions and behavior of people in the general population. According to Marston, people illustrate their emotions using four behavior types: Dominance, Inducement, Submission, and Compliance. 

In Marston's analysis, Dominance is characterized by actively using force to overcome resistance in the environment; Inducement involves using charm in order to deal with obstacles; Submission is a warm and voluntary acceptance of the need to fulfill a request; and Compliance represents fearful adjustment to a superior force.

He argued that these behavioral types came from people's sense of self and their interaction with the environment. He based the four types on two underlying dimensions that influenced people's emotional behavior. The first dimension is whether a person views their environment as favourable or unfavourable. The second dimension is whether a person perceives themselves as having control or lack of control over their environment.

References

Personality tests
1965 introductions
Pseudoscience
Personality typologies